The Speakeasy is the third studio album by American punk rock band Smoke or Fire. It was released on November 9, 2010, on Fat Wreck Chords.

Critical reception
Exclaim! wrote that "while The Speakeasy is good, it sounds as though the band got too comfortable with themselves." PopMatters wrote that "if you can get past some political self-congratulation, The Speakeasy is an energetic, often observant record."

Track listing

References

2010 albums
Fat Wreck Chords albums
Smoke or Fire albums